Cetrelia olivetorum is a species of fungus belonging to the family Parmeliaceae.

It has cosmopolitan distribution.

References

Parmeliaceae
Taxa named by William Nylander (botanist)